Jonathan Sandez (born May 6, 1992), professionally known by his stage name El Joni, is a singer-songwriter, guitarist and performer. Born and raised in Southern California, Joni began his music career in his pre-teens playing guitar and performing with local garage bands in San Bernardino, California. Although his early influences were heavy metal and rock his music now is a variety of Ranchera, Grupero and Cumbia music.

Life and career
Sandez was born in Ventura, California, United States, to a Mexican mother and father. He is the youngest of four children. At 15 years of age he became temporary bassist of a Regional Mexican band "Los Caminantes". After graduating from Pacific High School in San Bernardino, California, he became permanent bassist of the band and toured the United States and South America for two years. El Joni was also a member of the band "Grupo El Tiempo".

See also
 Los Caminantes

References

1992 births
Living people
People from Ventura, California
American male singer-songwriters
Singer-songwriters from California
21st-century American singers
21st-century American male singers